This is a list of Pakistan Super League records of and statistics since the first ever season in 2016. The league, which is organised by the PCB, is a franchise Twenty20 cricket competition held previously in the UAE and now in Pakistan.

Team records

Result summary

Source: ESPNcricinfo Last Update: 18 March 2023

Note:
 Tie&W and Tie&L indicates matches tied and then won or lost by "Super Over"
 The result percentage excludes no results and counts ties (irrespective of a tiebreaker) as half a win

Highest totals

Source: ESPNcricinfo Last Update: 18 March 2023

Lowest totals

Source: ESPNcricinfo Last Update: 18 March 2023

Batting records

Most runs

Source: ESPNcricinfo Last Update: 18 March 2023

Most runs in a season

Source: ESPNcricinfo Last Update: 18 March 2023

Highest individual score

Source: ESPNcricinfo Last Update: 18 March 2023

Most sixes in PSL history

Source: ESPNcricinfo Last Update: 18 March 2023

Most sixes in an innings

Source: ESPNcricinfo Last Update: 18 March 2023

Fastest Centuries (100)

Source: Inside Sport Last Update: 18 March 2023

Fastest  Half Centuries (50)

Source: Sports Info Last Update: 18 March 2023

Best strike rates

Minimum of 125 balls faced

Source: ESPNcricinfo Last Update: 18 March 2023

Bowling records

Most wickets

Source: ESPNcricinfo Last Update: 18 March 2023

Most wickets in a season

Source: ESPNcricinfo Last Update: 18 March 2023

Best bowling figures in an innings

Source: ESPNcricinfo Last Update: 18 March 2021

Best economy rates

Minimum of 250 balls bowled

Source: ESPNcricinfo Last Update: 18 March 2023

Best averages

Minimum of 250 balls bowled

Source: ESPNcricinfo Last Update: 18 March 2023

Best strike rates

Minimum of 250 balls bowled

Source: ESPNcricinfo Last Update: 18 March 2023

Most runs conceded in an innings

Source: ESPNcricinfo Last Update: 18 March 2023

Wicket-keeping records

Most dismissals

Source: ESPNcricinfo Last Updated: 18 March 2023

Most dismissals in a season

Source: ESPNcricinfo Last Update: 18 March 2023

Most dismissals in an innings

Source: ESPNcricinfo Last Update: 18 March 2023

Fielding records

Most catches

Source: ESPNcricinfo Last Update: 18 March 2023

Most catches in a season

Source: ESPNcricinfo Last Update: 18 March 2023

Most catches in an innings

Source: ESPNcricinfo Last Update: 18 March 2023

Partnership Records

Highest Partnership by wicket

Highest Partnership by Runs

Awards

Green cap and Hanif Mohammad award for best batsman of the season

Keys
 Green cap and Hanif Mohammad award was first introduced in 2017 Season.

Maroon cap and Fazal Mehmood award for best bowler of the season

Keys
 Maroon cap and Fazal Mahmood award was first introduced in 2017 Season.

Imtiaz Ahmed award for best wicket-keeper of the season

Keys
Imtiaz Ahmed award was first introduced in 2017 Season.

Player of the match (final) and series

See also
List of Pakistan Super League centuries

References

records and statistics
Super League
History of the Pakistan Super League